Georgi Guramovich Dzhioyev (born 13 June 1986) is a Russian football coach and former player. He is an assistant coach with FC Khimki.

Club career
He made his debut in the Russian Premier League in 2007 for FC Rostov.

In December 2009, his contract with FC Kuban Krasnodar expired and on 29 December 2009 he joined FC Tom Tomsk.

Playing for Kuban he was runner-up of the Russian First Division in 2008.

References

1986 births
People from Tskhinvali
Living people
Russian footballers
FC Spartak Vladikavkaz players
FC Fakel Voronezh players
FC Kuban Krasnodar players
FC Rostov players
FC Tom Tomsk players
Russian Premier League players
FC Zhemchuzhina Sochi players
FC Amkar Perm players
FC Luch Vladivostok players
Association football defenders